Tatyane Fontinhas Goulart (18 October 1983, in Rio de Janeiro) is a Brazilian actress.

Career 
Goulart debuted in 1991, working for seven years in the telenovela Felicidade, in the role of Bia.

She portrayed Ângela in Quatro por Quatro, and the last Emilia in the Sítio do Picapau Amarelo, replacing Isabelle Drummond, and Vanessa in the series Cinquentinha. In 2013, she returned to the big screen in Pecado Mortal.

In 2017, she debuted on stage with the play O Grande Amor da Minha Vida, next to Marcello Melo Jr.

Filmography

Television

References

External links 

1983 births
Living people
Actresses from Rio de Janeiro (city)
Brazilian telenovela actresses
Brazilian film actresses
Brazilian stage actresses